Freda Township is a township in Grant County, North Dakota, United States. Its population as of the 2000 Census was 12. It lies in the eastern part of the county along the Cannonball River.

History
Freda Township is named after Freda Van Sickle, the daughter of a railroad foreman working on the Milwaukee Railroad. The identically named town of Freda was once a major population center in the township, with a population of 50 in 1920.

The township was founded after the county was organized in 1916, and had a peak population of 178 during the 1930 U.S. Census.

A meteorite displayed at the Smithsonian Institution's American Museum of Natural History was discovered here in 1919.

References

External links
 U.S. Census map of Freda Township as of the 2000 Census

Townships in Grant County, North Dakota
Townships in North Dakota